Last Letter  is a 2018 Chinese romantic drama film written and directed by Japanese director Shunji Iwai, based on his own novel, and starring Zhou Xun, Qin Hao and Zhang Zifeng. It was released on November 9, 2018. Iwai adapted the same novel into a Japanese film, also known as Last Letter, released in 2020.

Synopsis
The film tells the story of a Chinese woman named Yuan Zhihua (Zhou Xun), a key figure to resolving a conflict that has lasted three generations.

Yuan Zhihua represents her deceased older sister at a middle school reunion and meets her previous lover, Yi Chuan. This sparks a series of letters involving Zhihua, Yi Chuan, her older sister, and her daughter.

Cast
 Zhou Xun as Yuan Zhihua
 Qin Hao as Yin Chuan
 Du Jiang as Zhou Wentao
 Zhang Zifeng as young Yuan Zhihua / Zhou Saran
 Deng Enxi as young Yuan Zhinan / Yuan Mumu
 Bian Tianyang as young Yin Chuan
 Hu Changlin as Yuan Chenchen
 Wu Yanshu (guest appearance) as Chen Guizhi
 Tan Zhuo (guest appearance) as Ji Hong
 Hu Ge (guest appearance) as Zhang Chao

Awards and nominations

References

External links
 

Japanese romantic drama films
2018 romantic drama films
Films set in Shanghai
Films shot in Shanghai
Chinese romantic drama films